The 1961 Soviet Chess Championship - 28th edition was held from 11 January to 11 February 1961 in Moscow. The tournament was won by Tigran Petrosian. The final were preceded by semifinals events at Odessa, Rostov and Vilnius. This was also a Zonal tournament with
four Interzonal places on offer. 1961 was the year of two Soviet Chess Championships, the 28th and the 29th editions.

Table and results

References 

USSR Chess Championships
Championship
Chess
1961 in chess
Chess